Alan Smith (15 October 1921 – 27 May 2019) was an English professional footballer who played in the Football League for Brentford, Arsenal and Leyton Orient as an outside left.

Personal life 
After leaving football, Smith worked for a time at a uranium mine in Canada, as a painter and decorator and for the London Electricity Board.

Career statistics

References

1921 births
English footballers
English Football League players
Brentford F.C. players
Footballers from Newcastle upon Tyne
Arsenal F.C. players
Leyton Orient F.C. players
Ashford United F.C. players
Association football outside forwards
2019 deaths
English expatriates in Canada
English miners
Kent Football League (1894–1959) players